Michael Elias Timisela (born 5 May 1986) is a Dutch former professional footballer who played as a right back.

Career
Born in Amsterdam, Timisela has played for Ajax and VVV-Venlo. In December 2012, he signed a three-year contract with Swedish club Hammarby, to begin with the 2013 season. He was released by Hammarby at the end of the 2014 season. In May 2015 Lillestrøm SK announced at their official website that they had signed Timisela.

Timisela returned to the Netherlands to play for Koninklijke HFC in 2017. He announced his retirement from football in January 2018 to focus on a career in civil society.

Personal life
He is of Indonesian descent.

References

1986 births
Living people
Dutch footballers
AFC Ajax players
VVV-Venlo players
Footballers from Amsterdam
Hammarby Fotboll players
Lillestrøm SK players
Dutch expatriate footballers
Expatriate footballers in Sweden
Expatriate footballers in Norway
Dutch expatriate sportspeople in Sweden
Dutch expatriate sportspeople in Norway
Association football fullbacks
Eredivisie players
Eerste Divisie players
Superettan players
Eliteserien players
Dutch people of Indonesian descent
Koninklijke HFC players